Venus, is a small neighbourhood of Perambur and a commercial area in North Chennai, a metropolitan city in Tamil Nadu, India. The small area around erstwhile Venus Theatre is called Venus unofficially by the people around Perambur. The erstwhile Venus theatre is demolished and constructed a new mall namely Spectrum Mall which has a five screen multiplex called S2 Cinemas which is controlled by theater franchise SPI Cinemas. The mall is developed and promoted by Ganga Foundations.

Location

Venus is located near Agaram, Peravallur and Perambur. It is well connected by train and bus transport. It is very close to Perambur and Perambur Carriage Works Railway Stations.

References

Neighbourhoods in Chennai